Abdallah Basit (born 15 October 1999) is a Ghanaian footballer who plays as a midfielder for Italian  club Benevento.

Club career
Basit played at Carpi and Napoli on youth level, before he signed to third-tier club Arezzo on the summer of 2018. He made his professional debut in the first round of 2018–19 season on 16 September 2018 against Lucchese, playing 90 minutes.

On 2 September 2019, he signed a 3-year contract with the Serie B side Benevento. Following Benevento's promotion to Serie A for the 2020–21 season, he did not make any appearances for the squad in the top tier in the first half of the season, despite being on the bench for most games. On 1 February 2021, he was loaned to Pescara.

On 20 January 2022, he went to Monterosi on loan.

References

Sources
 
 

1999 births
Living people
Association football midfielders
Ghanaian footballers
A.C. Carpi players
S.S.C. Napoli players
S.S. Arezzo players
Benevento Calcio players
Delfino Pescara 1936 players
Monterosi Tuscia F.C. players
Serie B players
Serie C players
Ghanaian expatriate footballers
Ghanaian expatriate sportspeople in Italy
Expatriate footballers in Italy